The Morocco men's national volleyball team represents Morocco in international volleyball competitions.

References
CAVB

Volleyball
 National men's volleyball teams
 Men's sport in Morocco
 Volleyball in Morocco